The judo competitions at the 2017 Southeast Asian Games in Kuala Lumpur were held at Kuala Lumpur Convention Centre.

There were a total of 6 events for the games, events such as Combat above 60kg up to 66kg, Combat above 66kg up to 73kg and combat above 73kg up to 81kg for the men’s event. And as for the women’s consists of combat above 57kg-63kg, combat above 63-70kg, combat above 70kg-78kg.

Medalists

Men

Women

Medal table

References

External links
  

2017 Southeast Asian Games events
2017
Asian Games, Southeast